The Canal des Salines was a planned canal in north eastern France. In its full extent it would have connected the river Sarre at Sarralbe with the river Moselle at Metz, via Dieuze and Château-Salins. Only 4km were completed, between Mittersheim and Loudrefing. The section between Sarralbe and Mittersheim was replaced by the Canal de la Sarre, built in the 1860s.

See also
 List of canals in France

References

External links
 Project Babel

Salines